Australian singer Troye Sivan is the recipient of multiple awards. Sivan began his career on YouTube, reaching over one million subscribers and winning an award at the 2014 Teen Choice Awards for "The Boyfriend Tag" video that featured fellow YouTuber Tyler Oakley.

In 2015, Sivan won Artist on the Rise and received his first APRA Music Award nomination for Breakthrough Songwriter of the Year. In 2016, he was nominated for seven ARIA Music Awards winning Best Video and Song of the Year for "Youth", also he was nominated for Breakthrough Long Form Video at 2016 MTV Video Music Awards for the video trilogy from Sivan's first album Blue Neighbourhood that featured the songs "Wild", "Fools" and "Talk Me Down".

In 2018, he released his second album Bloom, the album was met with widespread acclaim from critics and was nominated for three awards at the ARIA Music Awards of 2018 including Album of the Year. The same year, he released "Revelation" alongside Icelandic singer Jónsi for the film Boy Erased; the song was nominated for Original Song for a Feature Film at the 9th Hollywood Music in Media Awards.

Music and web awards

Acting awards

Notes

References

Sivan, Troye